Francis Seymour-Conway, 1st Baron Conway of Ragley, 1st Baron Conway of Killultagh, MP, PC (Ire) (28 May 1679 – 3 February 1731/1732), was a British politician, born Francis Seymour.

Background
Born Francis Seymour, he was the second son of Sir Edward Seymour, 4th Baronet, by his second wife Letitia, daughter of Alexander Popham. This branch of the Seymour family descended from Sir Edward Seymour, son of Edward Seymour, 1st Duke of Somerset by his first wife Catherine Filliol. His nephew Sir Edward Seymour succeeded as 8th Duke of Somerset in 1750. On the death of his elder brother Popham Seymour-Conway in 1699, Francis succeeded to the estates of his mother's relative Edward Conway, 1st Earl of Conway, and assumed the same year by Royal licence the additional surname of Conway.

Political career
Conway sat as Tory Member of Parliament for Bramber from 1701 to 1703. In 1703 he was raised to the Peerage of England as Baron Conway of Ragley, in the County of Warwick, and in 1712 he was created Baron Conway of Killultagh, in the County of Antrim, in the Peerage of Ireland. From 1728 to 1732 Lord Conway was Governor of Carrickfergus and was sworn of the Irish Privy Council in 1728.

Marriages and issue

Lord Conway married firstly Lady Mary, daughter of Laurence Hyde, 1st Earl of Rochester, on 17 February 1703/1704. They had four daughters:
Hon. Letitia Seymour-Conway (17 October 1704 – 1723)
Hon. Mary Seymour-Conway (August 1705 – 1728), married Nicholas Price
Hon. Henrietta Seymour-Conway (1706 – 10 May 1771)
Hon. Catherine Seymour-Conway (1708 – 14 June 1737)

After Lady Mary's death in Northwicke on 25 January 1708/1709 he married secondly Jane Bowden, of Drogheda, in that same year, by whom he had two children:
Hon. Edward Seymour-Conway (d. 8 April 1710)
Hon. Jane Seymour-Conway (d. 5 May 1749)

After Jane's death in Sandywell, Gloucestershire, on 13 February 1715/1716 he married thirdly Charlotte, daughter of John Shorter, of Bybrook, Kent, and wife, in July 1716.
Francis Seymour-Conway, 1st Marquess of Hertford (1718–1794)
Field Marshal Hon. Henry Seymour Conway (1721–1795)
Hon. Charlotte Seymour-Conway (22 July 1717 – September 1717)
Hon. George Augustus Seymour-Conway (b. August 1723), died an infant
Hon. Arabella Seymour-Conway, died young
Hon. Anne Seymour-Conway (d. 24 March 1774), married John Harris on 10 March 1755 and had issue
Hon. Charles Seymour-Conway, died young

Lord Conway died in February 1732 in Lisburn, aged 52, and was succeeded by his eldest son by his third wife, Francis Seymour-Conway, who was created Earl of Hertford in 1750 and Marquess of Hertford in 1793. Lady Conway died on 12 February 1733/1734.

References

External links

1679 births
1732 deaths
Barons in the Peerage of England
Peers of England created by Queen Anne
Members of the Privy Council of Ireland
Seymour-Conway, Francis
Francis Seymour-Conway, 1st Baron Conway
English MPs 1701
English MPs 1701–1702
English MPs 1702–1705
Barons in the Peerage of Ireland
Peers of Ireland created by Queen Anne